The women's 10,000 metres at the 2010 European Athletics Championships was held at the Estadi Olímpic Lluís Companys on 28 July.

Medalists

Records

Schedule

Results

Final

References
 Results
Full results

10000
10,000 metres at the European Athletics Championships
Marathons in Spain
2010 in women's athletics